Sveen is a surname. Notable people with the surname include: 

Åsmund Sveen (1910–1963), Norwegian poet, novelist and literary critic
Bonnie Sveen (born 1989/1990), Australian actress
Gard Sveen (born 1969), Norwegian crime fiction writer
Gerald Sveen (1924–2021), American politician
Karin Sveen (born 1948), Norwegian poet, novelist and essayist
Lars Petter Sveen (born 1981), Norwegian novelist
Ole Amund Sveen (born 1990), Norwegian football player
Tor Sveen (born 1962), Norwegian football player